Buabad (also Romanized as Būābād; also known as Behābād and Bovārā) is a village in Momenabad Rural District, in the Central District of Sarbisheh County, South Khorasan Province, Iran. At the 2006 census, its population was 95, in 27 families.

References 

Populated places in Sarbisheh County